Valery Davidovich Rubinchik  (17 April 1940, Minsk — 2 March 2011, Moscow) was a Soviet, Belarusian and Russian film director and screenwriter.

Biography
His father, David Isaakovich Rubinchik, was a director in the orchestra of Eddie Rosner, then director of the Russian Theater in Minsk; his mother, Maria Abramovna, worked as an engineer. Since childhood, he knew the theater and theatrical life, Valery deliberately chose the profession of director.

He graduated three courses at the Belarusian State Academy of Arts in Minsk (1962). He entered the directing faculty of VGIK.

Starting in 1969 he was the director at the studio Belarusfilm. After the first films made, the right to film   was obtained almost by accident   after the untimely death of the director . He was artistic director of the film studio.

Since 1990 he worked at Mosfilm.

He taught at VGIK, the Institute of Contemporary Art in Moscow, at the Higher Directing Courses, at the All-Russian Institute of Retraining and Advanced Training of Cinematography Workers. Among the students are Dilya Kurbatova, Vadim Sokolovsky, Anna Melikyan, Natalya Penkova, Aleksei Sidorov, actors Kseniya Kachalina, Dmitry Roshchin, Elena Korikova.

Personal life
He was married to actress Valentina Shendrikova (Cordelia at King Lear). Daughter   Marianna (born in 1974).

Death

Rubinchik on Rubinchik
I'm sorry about many things. First of all, I had long pauses between the films. I explain this by choosing a topic, a script for too long. I regret that I did not take a film about my post-war childhood, my beloved Minsk. What little worked in the theater. Sometimes I regret that I did not become an actor. In VGIK, I was known as a capable actor and therefore I was invited to all graduate performances of the acting faculty, to all the skits.

Awards
 Honored Artist of the Russian Federation (1998)
 (1980):
 Brussels International Fantastic Film Festival — Golden Raven
 Montréal World Film Festival — Jury Prize	
  — Best Film
 (2006):
 Moscow International Film Festival — Russian Film Clubs Federation Award

References

External links
 Валерий Давидович Рубинчик, декан факультета режиссуры кино и ТВ.

 Награды на кинофестивалях

1940 births
2011 deaths
Soviet film directors
Russian film directors
Belarusian film directors
Soviet screenwriters
20th-century Russian screenwriters
Male screenwriters
20th-century Russian male writers
Belarusian screenwriters
Gerasimov Institute of Cinematography alumni
Academicians of the Russian Academy of Cinema Arts and Sciences "Nika"
Belarusian State Academy of Arts alumni